Mount Michael Benedictine Abbey and High School is a Benedictine monastic community and boys high school just north of Elkhorn in the state of Nebraska in the Midwestern United States, within the Roman Catholic Archdiocese of Omaha.

History
The school, originally called St. John Vianney Seminary, was founded in 1953 by Immaculate Conception Abbey in Missouri as a high school and junior college for men preparing for the priesthood. In the spring of 1970, the monks established Mount Michael Benedictine School, a Catholic residential high school encompassing grades 9 through 12 with a focus on college-prep curriculum.

Mount Michael began as a five-day boarding school for students in Omaha and surrounding areas. During the 2002-2003 school year, Mount Michael introduced its day program for students who wished to commute to and from school each day, and the seven-day boarding program for international and out-of-state students.

Sports/extracurricular activities
Mount Michael competes in Class B Rivers Cities Conference for all sports. Sports and extracurricular activities offered at Mount Michael include cross country, tennis, football, wrestling, swimming/diving, basketball, golf, trapshooting, soccer, futsal, baseball, track & field, American Legion baseball, powerlifting, robotics, Men of Benedict Youth Group, Academic Decathlon, speech, slam poetry, strings, band, choir, drama, journalism, mock trial, student government, M4 Business Club (Mount Michael MasterMind), National Honor Society, math team, chemistry team, and physics team.

From its inception through 2015, Mount Michael won 31 state championships in a variety of sports and activities.

Transportation 
Mount Michael's only direct connection to the rest of the road system is by using the namesake Mt. Michael Road. Located north of Elkhorn and additionally close to the village of Waterloo, Nebraska, the school's primary road connections by highway are Nebraska Highway 64 and U.S. Route 275. No rail transport directly serves the school.

Notes and references

External links
School website
Abbey website

Catholic secondary schools in Nebraska
Boarding schools in Nebraska
Catholic boarding schools in the United States
Educational institutions established in 1953
Boys' schools in the United States
Roman Catholic Archdiocese of Omaha
Schools in Douglas County, Nebraska
1953 establishments in Nebraska
Benedictine monasteries in the United States
Benedictine secondary schools